Vesicle-associated membrane protein 1 (VAMP1) is a protein that in humans is encoded by the VAMP1 gene.

Function 

Synaptobrevins/VAMPs, syntaxins, and the 25-kD synaptosomal-associated protein SNAP25 are the main components of a protein complex involved in the docking and/or fusion of synaptic vesicles with the presynaptic membrane. VAMP1 is a member of the vesicle-associated membrane protein (VAMP)/synaptobrevin family. Multiple alternative splice variants that encode proteins with alternative carboxy ends have been described, but the full-length nature of some variants has not been defined.

Clinical significance 

Homozygous mutations in VAMP1 have been identified in a series of children affected with a form of congenital myasthenic syndrome and similar presynaptic features in these patients  and the knock-out VAMP1 mouse have been demonstrated.

Interactive pathway map

References

Further reading